17 Avenue SE is a major arterial road in east Calgary, Alberta.  17 Avenue SE is the focal point of the International Avenue Business Revitalization Zone (BRZ) and the main roadway through the former town of Forest Lawn.  Chestermere Boulevard is a major arterial road and the eastern extension of 17 Avenue SE through Chestermere, Alberta, Canada.  The roadway is a former alignment of Highway 1A.

Route description 

The west end of 17 Avenue SE begins with a small segment at a 5-way intersection with 9 Avenue SE and 15 Street SE (due to traffic calming, access to northbound 15 Street SE is closed), crossing the Canadian Pacific Railway, and ending at 17A Street SE. It begins again just to the south at the Blackfoot Trail / 19 Street SE intersection and crosses the Bow River via the Cushing Bridge before intersecting Deerfoot Trail (Highway 2).  Prior to the construction of Blackfoot Trail, 17 Avenue SE was a continuous roadway and the section between 19 Street SE and Deerfoot Trail is now generally referred to as part of Blackfoot Trail.  19 Street SE serves as the main access between 9 Avenue SE and Blackfoot Trail / 17 Avenue SE.

East of Deerfoot Trail, 17 Avenue SE leaves the Bow River valley and intersects Barlow Trail, though it is only accessible for westbound traffic.  It passes through the communities of Albert Park/Radisson Heights, Southview, and Forest Lawn, and continues east past Elliston Park before intersecting Stoney Trail.  It transitions into rural farmland and at 116 Street SE (also known as Range Road 284 or Conrich Road), enters into the city of Chestermere, where it becomes Chestermere Boulevard. It ends at the Highway 1 (Trans-Canada Highway) interchange, where it continues east as Range Road 243.

History 
17 Avenue SE is the original alignment of Highway 1 through eastern Calgary.  In 1949, Highway 1 was rerouted to follow 16 Avenue N, bypassing downtown Calgary and Forest Lawn, and 17 Avenue SE designated as Highway 1A.  The section of Highway 1A west of Deerfoot Trail was dropped in the 1970s, resulting in Highway 1A being a short alternate route into Calgary and its southeast industrial parks.  In 1993, the International Avenue BRZ was established resulting in 17 Avenue SE being nicknamed as International Avenue.  In 2007, the City of Calgary annexed land from Rocky View County up to Range Road 284 (now 116 Street SE); while in 2009, Chestermere annexed land up to the Calgary city limit, resulting in Highway 1A no longer travelling through a rural municipality and signaling a possible end to the Highway 1A designation. In 2013, the province of Alberta decommissioned Highway 1A, and as of 2016, remnant Highway 1A signage still remains on Deerfoot Trail and sections of 17 Avenue SE within Calgary; however, it has been removed along Stoney Trail, through Chestermere, and along the Trans-Canada Highway.

17 Avenue Transitway 
The transitway, which carries MAX Purple, begins to the south of 17 Avenue SE at the intersection 9 Avenue SE and 16 Street SE, and travels parallel to Blackfoot Trail and 17 Avenue SE, crossing the Bow River and Deerfoot Trail on its own dedicated bridges. At 28 Street SE, the transitway shifts to the centre of 17 Avenue SE and travels east before ending just west of Hubalta Road. Long-term plans call for the mixed-use corridor and transitway to extend east into Chestermere.

Construction began in 2017 and was divided into two phases – both of which were constructed simultaneously. Phase 1 focused on the dedicated bus-only transitway on 17 Avenue SE between 28 Street SE and Hubalta Road SE, which included the construction of BRT station platforms and a complete transformation of International Avenue infrastructure. Phase 2 focused on the construction of a transit and pedestrian only bridge crossing Deerfoot Trail, connecting 28 Street SE to 9 Avenue SE.

Major intersections 
From west to east.

See also 

Transportation in Calgary

References

External links 
 Main Streets - Planning the future of Calgary's thriving main streets
 International Avenue Business Revitalization Zone

Roads in Calgary
Former segments of the Trans-Canada Highway